is an elevated railway station on the Odakyu Odawara Line in Setagaya, Tokyo, Japan, operated by the private railway company Odakyu Electric Railway.

Lines

The station has two island platforms serving four tracks, with an additional centre track for non-stop trains which bypass the station.

Platforms

History
Kyōdō Station opened on 1 April 1927. The station was rebuilt as an elevated structure on 11 June 2000.

Station numbering was introduced in 2014 with Kyōdō being assigned station number OH11.

Passenger statistics
In fiscal 2011, the station was used by an average of 69,299 passengers daily. In fiscal 2015 the daily passenger numbers increased to 74,691. The average number of passengers had increased to 82,540 by 2021.

Surrounding area
 Tokyo University of Agriculture Setagaya Campus
 
 Odakyu Hakone Highway Bus, head office
Facilities in the station building
 7-Eleven
 Starbucks Coffee
 Hakone Soba
 Yokohama Bank ATM
 Japan Post (Youcho Bank) ATM

References

External links

 Kyōdō Station information (Odakyu) 

Railway stations in Japan opened in 1927
Odakyu Odawara Line
Stations of Odakyu Electric Railway
Railway stations in Tokyo